Dutton v Bognor Regis Urban District Council [1972] 1 QB 373 is an English contract law and English tort law case concerning defective premises and the limits of contract damages. It was disapproved by the House of Lords in Murphy v Brentwood DC and is now bad law except in Canada and New Zealand.

Facts
Mrs Dutton sought to recover damages from a builder, Bognor Regis Building Co Ltd, and the local council, Bognor Regis Urban District Council, that certified her house was sound, when it emerged that her house's foundations were defective because it had been built on a rubbish tip. This would have been discoverable if proper checks had been made. Mrs Dutton had bought the building from a Mr Clark, who in turn had bought the building from the builder, so that Mrs Dutton had no direct contract with either the builder or the council. She settled the claim with the builder for £625 after getting advice that an action in negligence could not succeed, but continued in an action against the council, and Cusack J awarded damages £2,115. The council appealed.

Judgment
The Court of Appeal held that Mrs Dutton could recover money from the council, as an extension of the principle in Donoghue v Stevenson. It was fair and reasonable that the council should be liable to a later purchaser of a house that its surveyor had negligently certified to be sound.

Lord Denning MR's judgment went as follows.

Critique
Denning essentially argues (not unlike noblesse oblige) that if an inspector has a statutory right to inspect the property under construction, he thereby acquires a duty of care to inspect carefully.  That is to say: a person who has a right has duties attached to that right.  But jurists Mickey Dias and Hohfeld have shown that rights and duties are jural correlatives. That is to say: if someone has a right, someone else owes a duty to them.  So here, the inspector has a right (to inspect), and the builder has a duty to let them inspect. The later  Murphy v Brentwood DC case revealed Denning's reasoning in Dutton to be flawed.

See also

English contract law

Notes

References

English contract case law
Lord Denning cases
Court of Appeal (England and Wales) cases
1972 in case law
1972 in British law